Irene J. Higginson  is a British professor, head of department and the director of King's College London's Cicely Saunders Institute.

Higginson has a medical degree from the University of Nottingham.

Higginson is the director of the Cicely Saunders Institute, at King's College London, the world's first purpose-built institute of palliative care. She was appointed an OBE in 2008 for services to medicine.

References

20th-century British medical doctors
21st-century British medical doctors
Living people
Alumni of the University of Nottingham
Academics of King's College London
Officers of the Order of the British Empire
Year of birth missing (living people)
NIHR Senior Investigators